Early general elections were held in Kuwait on 1 December 2012 after early elections in February 2012 were declared invalid.

In the elections, Shi'as won 17 out of 50 seats in the National Assembly, an increase from the seven won in the February elections. Sunni Islamists were reduced to a minority. Three women also entered the Parliament compared to men-only from the February election, but their number decreased compared to the 2009 election.

Turnout was officially reported to be 43%, the lowest in the Kuwaiti electoral history.

Background
Six weeks before the elections, the electoral system was changed to single non-transferable vote, with voters restricted to voting for only one candidate, having previously been allowed to vote for four under multiple non-transferable vote. The changes resulted in mass protests and an opposition boycott of the elections. Shafeeq Ghabra, professor at the Faculty of Political Sciences at Kuwait University said that, "it's clear that the boycott was very successful." The opposition rejected a unilateral amendment of the electoral law that reduced the number of votes per person from four to one.

Results

Aftermath
On 5 December, despite calls for political reforms, Jaber Al-Mubarak Al-Hamad Al-Sabah was reappointed Prime Minister. In the opening session of the Assembly, Ali al-Rashid was elected Speaker.

In June 2013, the Constitutional Court ordered the dissolution of the National Assembly and the holding of fresh elections.

References

2012 elections in Asia
2012 in Kuwait
Elections in Kuwait
Annulled elections
December 2012 events in Asia